This is a character list for the independent British comic book series Strangehaven.

The Protagonist
Alex Hunter is the protagonist for much of the series, and is the primary audience identification figure. He arrives in Strangehaven after a car accident in which swerved to avoid hitting a young woman on the road ahead of him. However, his claim is suspect as the woman was never located. As he is estranged from his wife, whom he discovered was committing adultery, Alex has little reason to leave Strangehaven — which is useful, as the village itself does not seem to permit him to go outside the forest and coastline around it; any attempt to go further causes him to loop back in on Strangehaven. Alex is interested in Janey Jones, although their relationship seldom runs smooth; Alex works for Janey's father at Strangehaven's primary school. Alex has become the focus of two secret groups in Strangehaven: The Knights of the Golden Light, a secretive lodge who want to control Strangehaven's power, and thus the world, and a small coven of witches run by Dor. He is superseded as the protagonist by Sergeant Clarke in the issues directly after Strangehaven #12.

The Bateses
Ben Bates is the oldest of the three Bates brothers, and runs the local pub, The Minotaur. He is dating Debbie.

Billy Bates is the middle Bates brother and, at the start of the series is nearing the end of his imprisonment for physically assaulting Suzie Tang, who was once his girlfriend. He subsequently becomes a suspect in the mysterious three-way murder/suicide/vanshing case that occurs at the end of Strangehaven #12. He later leaves the village on the advice of Sergeant Clarke in Strangehaven #16.

Bobby Bates is the youngest of the Bates brothers, just out of school, and harbours a crush on Janey Jones. Billy manages to date her briefly after she falls out with Alex, but his childish ways eventually drive her off.

The Bonnetis
Albert Bonneti, or "Bertie", is the town's mechanic and is seemingly able to turn even the most ruined wreck into a fully functional car in just a few days. His extraordinary skills are commented on but never explained, and he is skeptical about the supernatural, making good-natured fun out of his wife's wiccan beliefs, so it is unlikely that he has any unusual powers.

Vicki Bonneti runs the Arcadia tea rooms and is part of a practicing coven that aims to neutralise the power of the Knights of the Golden Light. Her fellow wiccan, Dor, is also her best friend.

Marco and Gina Bonneti are Albert and Vicki's mischievous children.

The Doctor's family
Charles Houseman is the village's doctor and a member of The Knights of the Golden Light. He is shown to be professional and courteous towards his patients but cold with his wife, Maureen, and outright abusive towards his twin brother, George. He is a close friend of Sergeant Kent Clarke, another Knight, and both are opposed to the Knights' leader, John Jones, whom they see as a dangerous figure misusing the Knights' power. He spends much of the series unaware of the fact that his wife is trying to kill him. He dies accidentally in Strangehaven #18.

George Houseman is the twin brother of Charles, but while Charles became a successful doctor, George is a slovenly alcoholic. George is extremely jealous of his brother's success and intelligence, but is shown to still love him on several occasions. Despite this, Charles treats George with utter contempt. George briefly allows himself to be seduced by Maureen, Charles's wife, and subsequently becomes infatuated with her, although she is only using him to upset her husband. After Charles dies, Maureen convinces him to take his brother's place, knowing that she will be arrested for murder otherwise.

Maureen Houseman is Charles's spiteful wife. When Charles refuses to grant her a divorce, their relationship deteriorates even further and she resorts to trying to kill him, but fails each time. Eventually, she is able to seduce Charles's twin brother, George, in order to make Charles jealous. She is a cold-hearted and apparently conscienceless woman.

The Joneses
John is the patriarch of the family, the headteacher at the local primary school, and the head of the Knights of the Golden Light. He is a proud man, quick to anger, and is interested only in running the Knights' lodge, not the welfare of his family. He once punched his son, Jeremy, for making fun of the Knights, and threatened to snap Janey's neck unless she told him how she'd found out some of the Knights' secrets. He is often shown intimidating members of the brotherhood, something which puts fellow knights Charles and Sergeant Clarke on edge. Clarke seems to be the only one who will stand up to John.

Janet is John's wife, and although she loves her children she cannot stand the way her husband treats them.

Janey is a receptionist for Charles and one of the two Jones twins. She is the romantic interest for Alex, although their relationship has been rocky — first because she moved their relationship too fast for him, and later because she caught him and Dor in an innocent but apparently compromising position. She seems to attract a lot of attention from the men of the village and had a brief relationship with Bobby Bates.

Jeremy is Janey's twin brother, although as they were born on opposite sides of midnight they share different birthdays. He is a carpenter and has the nickname "Chippy". As the series progresses, he develops a close friendship with Megaron, who teaches him the way of the Amazonian shaman. Rumours abound that Megaron is interested in Jeremy romantically, but Jeremy is quick to shoot these down. He has little time for his father or the Knights, something which bothers John greatly.

Hitchcock is Janey's cat. It always seems to be present when Alex is having a vision of the Woman on the Road, and has been shown entering the house in which her body is stored.

The Twins
Deborah, or "Debbie", has been dating Ben Bates.

Veronica, or "Ronnie", is the town's postwoman and is actively pursuing Adam, a fact which unnerves him slightly. She is willing to listen to his theories at length, although whether she believes him or not is unknown. She previously had a relationship with George, but it didn't end well.

The McCreadies
Maggie McCreadie, or "Mrs McCreadie" runs the local guest house and has lived in Strangehaven since she and her daughter were evacuated there during World War II. She is often on hand to provide advice and comfort to the village's inhabitants. She can sometimes be seen at night, looking for something in the local graveyard. Mrs McCreadie died of natural causes in Strangehaven #16.

Michael McCreadie was an RAF pilot who was shot down over Strangehaven and made a crash-landing in the woods on its outskirts. Somehow, he finds himself in the present-day Strangehaven and is reunited with his wife, who is subsequently restored to youth as they walk off into the sunset. Alex and Vicki subsequently find his body, long since rotted away to a skeleton, in the wreckage of his plane in Strangehaven #18.

Vicki Bonetti is Michael and Maggie's daughter; see above.

The Webbs
Beverly Webb is the wife of Peter Webb and helps run the village greengrocers' shop. At the start of the series, and unbeknownst to her, Peter is cheating on her with Suzie. Beverly subsequently finds out and is horrified. This horror is compounded when she discovers that Charles had mixed up her and Peter's medical files and that it is she, not Peter, who is dying of bone marrow cancer. Her body is found in the bathtub in Strangehaven #12. It later emerges that she died accidentally while trying to kill Suzie.

Peter Webb is the local greengrocer and a member of the Knights of the Golden Light. He is also something of a playboy, having cheated numerous times on his wife, Beverly. At the start of the series, he is in an ongoing illicit relationship with Suzie, which hits rocky ground when he refuses to tell Beverly about them. He is also diagnosed with terminal bone marrow cancer early in the series. He comes under fire from the Knights for spilling their secrets to Suzie, and is later revealed to be working as a double agent for The Coven. He is killed by unknown assailants in Strangehaven #12.

The Knights of the Golden Light
Brian Dempsey is infamous throughout the village for his bitter temperament and quickness to anger. He rarely seems to have a kind word to say about anyone, but strikes up a tentative friendship with Alex. His sadness came upon him after his wife left him two years back. He can often be seen on the cliffs outside Strangehaven, staring out to sea.

Charles (see above)

John Jones (see above)

Kent Clarke is the village's only police officer (he holds the rank of Sergeant). He is initially shown to be a sinister character, taking secret photographs of Alex and Dor talking, and taking fingernail clippings and hair strands from female villagers, which he places in formaldehyde for his "collection". However, after a gruesome murder in issue 12 he then becomes the comic's protagonist for a while, as it follows his investigation, and he is shown here to be torn between serving justice and protecting the Knights. He is close friends with Charles, and they both share suspicions about John Jones, the leader of the Knights. Sergeant Clarke also has the unusual habit of holding conversations with his teddy-bear, Watson, when poring over evidence — although whether Watson's voice is real, imagined, or just Clarke being playful is not clear.

Peter Webb (see above)

Simon runs the Post Office and is brought into the Knights' lodge over the course of the series. A bespectacled, nervous fellow, he often uses secret Knight code openly in public, earning him the annoyance of John Jones. He once asked Janey out, but she turned him down.

Victor Garde is Alex's solicitor in Strangehaven, and is the one to ask whether Alex wishes to join The Knights. He is professional and despairs when Alex decides to give his wife whatever she wants, even though Victor believes he could get at least half of their belongings. Victor's office is being wiretapped by unknown people, possibly the Knights.

The Coven
Dor is a local painter, wiccan, and leader of the coven. Alex meets her when she is using his house as a subject for her painting, and she later helps him after he is drugged by the Knights for refusing the offer of their initiation. She believes that Strangehaven is the centre of the world's mystic energy, and that the Knights want to misuse it to control much more than just Strangehaven. She asks Alex to replace Peter Webb, who was the coven's previous double-agent.

Emmanuel Megaron is a tribesman from the Amazon whose mother came from England; he is a practicing shaman and is teaching Jeremy Jones some of his skills. He left his village to escape a circle of revenge killings that he had been drawn into — but not before first killing the boy who murdered his brother. It is rumoured that he is gay, and that his tutoring of Jeremy is a way to get closer to the young man, although both he and Jeremy have denied this.

Vicki Bonneti (see above)

Other villagers
Adam Douglas claims to be an alien from the planet Nimoi (possibly a reference to Leonard Nimoy), but looks perfectly human and speaks with a Dutch accent. He has an in-depth knowledge of quantum physics and has built a laboratory to try to contact his people. Whether or not he is actually an alien is ambiguous; at one point he seems to use his X-ray vision to see through Veronica's top, but this may just be his imagination. Veronica finds him very attractive and is actively trying to get him into bed, something which he finds unnerving, as he claims that in his species the men are the only sexual aggressors.

Elsie is an old woman who claims to be deaf and blind, but is apparently neither. She has many animals, including rabbits, dogs, and parrots, which can apparently speak to her, although they notably only speak with her voice. It may be that she can use the animals' eyes and ears to replace her own senses, much in the same way as Megaron can inhabit the bodies of birds, but whether she has powers, or is mentally ill, or both is never made clear.

"Surfer" Steve is a Strangehaven local who seems to have some knowledge of the village's true nature, and believes that it is not only alive but sentient. Alex finds him out on Strangehaven's shoreline, surfing, and Steve gives him a lift back into the town. He has not appeared again as of issue #18.

Suzie Tang is Janey's best friend and Peter Webb's mistress. She often helps out Janey with her relationship troubles, especially in regard to Alex. However, she is also possessive of Peter. Frustrated at his refusal to tell his wife, Beverly, about their affair, she eventually confronts the woman herself, with tragic consequences. Suzie fled England to return to her parents in Hong Kong, as seen in Strangehaven #16.

The Woman on the Road is the nameless, ghostly figure seen by Alex just prior to his crash, and later in his dreams and other visions, including one in which she walked into the sea off Strangehaven's coastline. The woman's physical body appears to be kept in a giant fish tank the house of an unnamed and unseen Strangehaven resident who refers to her as his "darling". Her body does not appear to be decomposed, and it is not clear whether she is dead. However, it is missing patches of skin and flesh in certain areas, most notably on the ribs and limbs.

Strangehaven